This article contains a list of notable snooker referees. Snooker is a cue sport played on a rectangular table covered with a green cloth, or baize, with pockets at each of the four corners and in the middle of each long side.

Current
  Erik Amberg<ref
name=WSO />
 
  Terry Camilleri
  – officiated the 2004, 2016 and 2021 world finals.
  Greg Coniglio
  Alex Crișan
  Kevin Dabrowski
  Nico De Vos
  - officiated the 2020 world final.
  Jurgen Gruson
  Wang Haitao
  Colin Humphries
  Malgorzata Kanieska
 
  Mark King
  Luise Kraatz
  Nigel Leddie
  Peggy Li
  – officiated at the 2015 and 2022 World final.
  Radosław Matusiak
  Hilde Moens
  – officiated at the 2014 and 2018 World finals.
  Thorsten Mueller
  Miłosz Olborski
  John Pellew
  Martyn Royce
  Jan Scheers
  Ingo Schmidt
  – officiated at the 2019 World final.
  Theo Selbertinger
  Deng Shihao
  Rob Spencer
  Glen Sullivan-Bisset
  Monika Sułkowska
  Anastasiya Tuzikava
  Proletina Velichkova
  – officiated for the 2003, 2006, 2008, 2011, 2013, and 2017 World finals.
  Wang Wei
  Zheng Weili
  Ben Williams
 
  Lyu Xilin
  Andy Yates
  Zhu Ying
  Xie Yixin
  Robert Zabłocki

Former
  Lawrie Annandale – officiated for the 1998 World final.
  Stuart Bennett
  Colin Brinded – officiated for the 1999 World final.
  Bill Camkin – officiated for the 1927 World final.
  Alan Chamberlain – officiated for the 1997 World final.
  Charles Chambers – referee in the match that led to the rule about minimum  length. (See Cue stick)
  Bruce Duncan
  Len Ganley – officiated for the 1983, 1987, 1990, and 1993 World finals.
  Sydney Lee
  Willie Leigh – officiated for the 1934 World final.
  Fred Jarvis – officiated for the 1928 World final.
  Michael Montalto
  Patricia Murphy 
  John Newton – officiated for the 2000 World final.
  Johan Oomen
  Harold Phillips – officiated for the 1969 World final.
  Fred Smith – officiated for the 1928 World final.
  John Smyth – officiated for the 1977 and 1982 World finals.
  John Street – officiated for the 1980, 1986, 1989, 1992 and 1995 World finals.
  Michaela Tabb– officiated for the 2009 and 2012 World finals.
  Jim Thorpe – officiated for the 1984  World final.
  Martin Webb
  Eirian Williams – officiated for the 2001, 2005, 2007, and 2010 World finals.
  John Williams – officiated for the 1978, 1979, 1981, 1985, 1988, 1991, 1994, 1996, and 2002 World finals.
  Peter Williamson

References

 
Referees
Snooker